José Luis Boscolo, known as Zé Luis (born 21 March 1971) is a Brazilian retired footballer.

Club career
Born in São Paulo, Zé Luis played with the Brazilian sides União São João, Lousano Paulista, Caldense, Taubaté, Platinense, Velo Clube and Ferroviária. He also played abroad, with the Serbian side Sartid Smederevo in the 1997–98 First League of FR Yugoslavia, along with two other Brazilians, Endelson and Raul Simplício. All three left Sartid at the end of the season.

References

1971 births
Living people
Footballers from São Paulo
Brazilian footballers
Brazilian expatriate footballers
Association football forwards
União São João Esporte Clube players
Paulista Futebol Clube players
Associação Atlética Caldense players
Esporte Clube Taubaté players
Associação Ferroviária de Esportes players
FK Smederevo players
First League of Serbia and Montenegro players
Expatriate footballers in Serbia and Montenegro